Harmon Washington Hendricks (1846–1928) was the president of the Hendricks Brothers copper trading company in the United States. He was vice chairman of the board of trustees for the Museum of the American Indian.

References

1846 births
1928 deaths
19th-century American businesspeople